Habibul Islam Habib is a Bangladesh Nationalist Party politician and the former Member of Parliament of Satkhira-1.

Career
Habib was elected to parliament from Satkhira-1 as a Bangladesh Nationalist Party candidate in 2001. In 2015, he was charged with attacking a convoy of Prime Minister Sheikh Hasina in Satkhira in 2002.

References

Bangladesh Nationalist Party politicians
Living people
8th Jatiya Sangsad members
People from Satkhira District
6th Jatiya Sangsad members
Year of birth missing (living people)